Réveil de la Côte Ouest ('Awakening of the West Coast') was a French language weekly newspaper published from Majunga, Madagascar 1932–1934. Politically, Réveil de la Côte Ouest had a leftist and nationalist outlook.

References

French-language newspapers published in Africa
Newspapers published in Madagascar
1932 establishments in Madagascar
1934 disestablishments in Madagascar
Publications established in 1932
Publications disestablished in 1934